Sorting nexin-15 is a protein that in humans is encoded by the SNX15 gene.

This gene encodes a member of the sorting nexin family. Members of this family contain a phox (PX) domain, which is a phosphoinositide binding domain, and are involved in intracellular trafficking. Overexpression of this gene results in a decrease in the processing of insulin and hepatocyte growth factor receptors to their mature subunits. This decrease is caused by the mislocalization of furin, the endoprotease responsible for cleavage of insulin and hepatocyte growth factor receptors. This protein is involved in endosomal trafficking from the plasma membranee to recycling endosomes or the trans-Golgi network. This gene encodes two transcript variants encoding distinct isoforms.

References

Further reading